Broad Canal is a short canal in East Cambridge, Massachusetts, previously larger and part of the now-vanished canal system that made Cambridge an active seaport.

The canal began in 1806 when Henry Hill, Rufus Davenport, and others laid out a canal system in the land and tidal flats along the Charles River. Connecting canals ran through much of today's East Cambridge.

No visible trace remains of that system, and extensive landfills have removed all remnants of Cambridge's seaport docks and wharves. Broad Canal's truncated remnants can now be found just north of Broadway, entering the Charles River immediately north of the Longfellow Bridge.

References 
 Massachusetts Committee on Charles River Dam, Henry Smith Pritchett, chairman, Evidence and Arguments Before the Committee on Charles River Dam, Wright & Potter Printing Co., State Printers, 1903. Pages 459-461.

Buildings and structures in Cambridge, Massachusetts
Canals in Middlesex County, Massachusetts